AMSL Fréjus Volleyball (Association municipale des sports et loisirs de Fréjus volley-ball) is a French volleyball club, section of the AMSL Fréjus multi-sports club, which now plays in the fourth division, but in its history has several national titles.

History 
The club was founded in 1974, with the full name of the Municipal Association of Sports et Loisir de Fréjus. It climbed the French championships up to the top flight, and in 1986 won its first trophy, the French Cup. The formation dominated the national scene in the late eighties, winning three consecutive championships. With the title of Champion of France it participated in several editions of the European Cups. The best result in the maximum continental trophy is dated in 1989-90, when Fréjus reached the final and was defeated 2-3 by the Italian powerhouse Philips Modena.

In 1992, despite the victory of the third coupled league-cup, it suffered a heavy financial difficulties that the team dropped back in the lower leagues, where he still plays today.

Honours 

French League
 Winners (4): 1986-87, 1987–88, 1988–89, 1991-92
French Cup
 Winners (5): 1985-86, 1986–87, 1988–89, 1990–91, 1991–92
CEV Champions League
 Runners-up (1): 1989-90

External links 
 Official site

French volleyball clubs
Volleyball clubs established in 1975
1975 establishments in France